Richard Bober was born in Elizabeth, New Jersey on August 14, 1943, in the United States of America.  He is well known for the cover illustration of many paperback novels. He has produced many paintings on commission, which have been sold at auction, and have been available for sale from art galleries, in the United States.

References
Science Fiction Artists Database Diamond Bay Research. (Retrieved 2 March 2010.)
Past Auction Results for Richard Bober Art - Richard Bober on artnet artnet. (Retrieved 2 March 2011.)
RICHARD BOBER - DRAGON FALL COVER PRELIM PAINTED ART - Lewis Wayne Gallery Lewis Wayne Gallery. (Retrieved 2 March 2011.)

American illustrators
1943 births
Living people